John Brown's raid on Harpers Ferry was an effort by abolitionist John Brown, from October 16 to 18, 1859, to initiate a slave revolt in Southern states by taking over the United States arsenal at Harpers Ferry, Virginia (since 1863, West Virginia). It has been called the dress rehearsal for, or tragic prelude to, the Civil War.

Brown's party of 22 was defeated by a company of U.S. Marines, led by First Lieutenant Israel Greene. Ten of the raiders were killed during the raid, seven were tried and executed afterwards, and five escaped. Several of those present at the raid would later be involved in the Civil War: Colonel Robert E. Lee was in overall command of the operation to retake the arsenal. Stonewall Jackson and Jeb Stuart were among the troops guarding the arrested Brown, and John Wilkes Booth was a spectator at Brown's execution. Walt Whitman projected his poetic I as a silent spectator in his poem "Year of Meteors," although he was not actually present. John Brown had originally asked Harriet Tubman and Frederick Douglass, both of whom he had met in his transformative years as an abolitionist in Springfield, Massachusetts, to join him in his raid, but Tubman was prevented by illness and Douglass declined, as he believed Brown's plan was suicidal.

The raid caused more excitement in the United States than had been seen in many years. It was extensively covered in the press nationwide—it was the first such national crisis to be publicized using the new electrical telegraph. Reporters were on the first train leaving for Harpers Ferry after news of the raid was received, at 4 p.m. on Monday, October 17. As there were few official messages to send or receive, the telegraph carried on the next train, connected to the cut telegraph wires, was "given up to reporters", who "are in force strong as military". By Tuesday morning the telegraph line had been repaired, and there were reporters from The New York Times "and other distant papers".

The label "raid" was not used at the time. A month after the attack, a Baltimore newspaper listed 26 terms used, including "insurrection", "rebellion", "treason", and "crusade". "Raid" was not among them.

Brown's raid was at first viewed as madness, the work of a fanatic. It was his words and letters after the raid and at his trial, Virginia v. John Brown, aided by the writings of supporters including Henry David Thoreau, that turned him into a hero and icon for the Union.

Brown's preparation
Brown came with a small group of men minimally trained for military action. His group eventually included 21 men besides himself (16 white men, five Black men). Northern abolitionist groups sent 198 breech-loading .52-caliber Sharps carbines ("Beecher's Bibles"). He ordered from a blacksmith in Connecticut 950 pikes, for use by Blacks untrained in the use of firearms, as few were. He told curious neighbors that they were tools for mining, which aroused no suspicion as for years the possibility of local mining for metals had been explored. Brown "frequently took home with him parcels of earth, which he pretended to analyse in search of minerals. Often his neighbors would visit him when he was making his chemical experiments and so well did he act his part that he was looked upon as one of profound learning and calculated to be a most useful man to the neighborhood."

The pikes were never used; a few Blacks in the engine house carried one, but none used it. After the action was over and most of the principals dead or imprisoned, they were sold at high prices as souvenirs. Harriet Tubman had one, and Abby Hopper Gibbons another; the Marines returning to base each had one. When all had been taken or sold, an enterprising mechanic started making and selling new ones. "It is estimated that enough of these have been sold as genuine to supply a large army." Virginian Fire-Eater Edmund Ruffin had them sent to the governors of every slave state, with a label that said "Sample of the favors designed for us by our Northern Brethren". He also carried one around in Washington D.C., showing it to every one he could, "so as to create fear and terror of slave insurrection".

The United States Armory was a large complex of buildings that manufactured small arms for the U.S. Army (1801–1861), with an Arsenal (weapons storehouse) that was thought to contain at the time 100,000 muskets and rifles. However Brown, who had his own stock of weapons, did not seek to capture those of the Arsenal.

Brown attempted to attract more black recruits, and felt the lack of a Black leader's involvement. He tried recruiting Frederick Douglass as a liaison officer to the slaves in a meeting held (for safety) in an abandoned quarry at Chambersburg, Pennsylvania. It was at this meeting that ex-slave "Emperor" Shields Green, rather than return home with Douglass (in whose house Green was living), decided to join with John Brown on his attack on the United States Armory, Green stating to Douglass "I believe I will go with the old man". Douglass declined, indicating to Brown that he believed the raid was a suicide mission. The plan was "an attack on the federal government" that "would array the whole country against us. ...You will never get out alive", he warned.

According to Osborne Anderson, "the Old Captain told us, we stood nine chances to one to be killed; but, said the Captain at the same time[,] 'there are moments when men can do more dead than alive.'"

The Kennedy Farmhouse served as "barracks, arsenal, supply depot, mess hall, debate club, and home". It was very crowded and life there was tedious. Brown was worried about arousing neighbors' suspicions. As a result, the raiders had to stay indoors during the daytime, without much to do but study (Brown recommended Plutarch's Lives), drill, argue politics, discuss religion, and play cards and checkers. Brown's daughter-in-law Martha served as cook and housekeeper. His daughter Annie served as lookout. She remarked later that these were the most important months of her life. Brown wanted women at the farm, to prevent suspicions of a large all-male group. The raiders went outside at night to drill and get fresh air. Thunderstorms were welcome since they concealed noise from Brown's neighbors.

Brown did not plan to execute a quick raid and immediately escape to the mountains. Rather, he intended to arm rebellious slaves with the aim of striking terror in the slaveholders in Virginia. Believing that on the first night of action, 200 to 500 slaves would join his line, Brown ridiculed the militia and the regular army that might oppose him. He planned to send agents to nearby plantations, rallying the slaves, and to hold Harpers Ferry for a short time, with the expectation that as many volunteers, white and black, would join him as would form against him. He would then move rapidly southward, sending out armed bands along the way that would free more slaves, obtain food, horses, and hostages, and destroy slaveholders' morale. Brown intended to follow the Appalachian Mountains south into Tennessee and even Alabama, the heart of the South, making forays into the plains on either side.

Advanced knowledge of the raid

Brown paid Hugh Forbes $100 per month,
to a total of $600, to be his drillmaster. Forbes was an English mercenary who served Giuseppe Garibaldi in Italy. Forbes' Manual for the Patriotic Volunteer was found in Brown's papers after the raid. Brown and Forbes argued over strategy and money. Forbes wanted more money so that his family in Europe could join him. Forbes sent threatening letters to Brown's backers in an attempt to get money. Failing in this effort, Forbes traveled to Washington, DC, and met with U.S. Senators William H. Seward and Henry Wilson. He denounced Brown to Seward as a "vicious man" who needed to be restrained, but did not disclose any plans for the raid. Forbes partially exposed the plan to Senator Wilson and others. Wilson wrote to Samuel Gridley Howe, a Brown backer, advising him to get Brown's backers to retrieve the weapons intended for use in Kansas. Brown's backers told him that the weapons should not be used "for other purposes, as rumor says they may be". In response to warnings, Brown had to return to Kansas to shore up support and discredit Forbes. Some historians believe that this trip cost Brown valuable time and momentum.

Another important figure that helped to pay for the raid was Mary Ellen Pleasent. She donted $30,000 (equivalent to $1,087,373.49 in 2023), saying it "most important and significant act of her life".

Estimates are that at least eighty people knew about Brown's planned raid in advance, although Brown did not reveal his total plan to anyone. Many others had reasons to believe that Brown was contemplating a move against the South. One of those who knew was David J. Gue of Springdale, Iowa, where Brown had spent time. Gue was a Quaker who believed that Brown and his men would be killed. Gue decided to warn the government "to protect Brown from the consequences of his own rashness". He sent an anonymous letter to Secretary of War John B. Floyd:

He was hoping that Floyd would send soldiers to Harpers Ferry. He hoped that the extra security would motivate Brown to call off his plans.

Even though President Buchanan offered a $250 reward for Brown, Floyd did not connect the John Brown of Gue's letter to the John Brown of Pottawatomie, Kansas, fame. He knew that Maryland did not have an armory (Harpers Ferry is in Virginia, today West Virginia, just across the Potomac River from Maryland.) Floyd concluded that the letter writer was a crackpot, and disregarded it. He later said that "a scheme of such wickedness and outrage could not be entertained by any citizen of the United States".

Brown's second in command John Henry Kagi wrote to a friend on October 15, the day before the attack, that they had heard there was a search warrant for the Kennedy farmhouse, and therefore they had to start eight days sooner than planned.

Timeline of the raid

Sunday, October 16

On Sunday night, October 16, 1859, at about 11 PM, Brown left three of his men behind as a rear-guard, in charge of the cache of weapons: his son Owen Brown, Barclay Coppock, and Francis Jackson Meriam, and led the rest across the bridge and into the town of Harpers Ferry, Virginia. Brown detached a party under John Cook, Jr., to capture Colonel Lewis Washington, great-grandnephew of George Washington, at his nearby Beall-Air estate, free his slaves, and seize two relics of George Washington: a sword Lewis Washington said had been presented to George Washington by Frederick the Great, and two pistols given by Marquis de Lafayette, which Brown considered talismans. The party carried out its mission and returned via the Allstadt House, where they took more hostages and freed more slaves.

Brown's men needed to capture the Armory and then escape before word could be sent to Washington. The raid was going well for Brown's men. They cut the telegraph line twice, to prevent communication in either direction: first on the Maryland side of the bridge; slightly later on the far side of the station, preventing communication with Virginia.

Some of Brown's men were posted so as to control both the Potomac and the Shenandoah bridges. Others went into the town; it was the middle of the night and a single watchman was the only person at the Armory. He was forced to turn over his keys.

Brown had been sure that he would get major support from slaves ready to rebel; his followers said to a man that he had told them that. But Brown had no way to inform these slaves; they did not arrive, and Brown waited too long for them. The South, starting with Governor Wise, whose speech after Harpers Ferry was reprinted widely, proclaimed that this showed the truth of their old allegation, that their slaves were happy and did not want freedom. Osborne Anderson, the only raider to leave a memoir, and the only Black survivor, put the lie to this:

Monday, October 17

A free Black man was the first fatality to result from the raid: Heyward Shepherd, a baggage handler at the Harpers Ferry train station, who had ventured out onto the bridge to look for a watchman who had been driven off by Brown's raiders. He was shot from behind when he by chance encountered the raiders, refused to freeze, and headed back to the station. That a black man was the first casualty of an insurrection whose purpose was to aid Blacks, and that he disobeyed the raiders, made him a hero of the "Lost Cause" pro-Confederacy movement; a monument enshrining this perspective on Shepherd's death was installed in 1931. But in fact, as he was dying, Shepherd said he did not know about the raid and thought the men were robbers.

The shot and a cry of distress were heard by physician John Starry, who lived across the street from the bridge and walked over to see what was happening. After he saw it was Shepherd and that he could not be saved, Brown let him leave. Instead of going home he started the alarm, having the bell on the Lutheran church rung, sending a messenger to summon help from Charles Town, and then going there himself, after having notified such local men as could be contacted quickly.

The Baltimore & Ohio train

About 1:15 AM the eastbound Baltimore & Ohio express train from Wheeling—one per day in each direction—was to pass through towards Baltimore. The night watchman ran to warn of trouble ahead; the engineer stopped and then backed up the train. Two train crew members who stepped down to reconnoiter were shot at. 
Brown boarded the train and talked with passengers for over an hour, not concealing his identity. (Because of his abolitionist work in Kansas, Brown was a "notorious" celebrity; he was well known to any newspaper reader.) Brown then told the train crew they could continue. According to the conductor's telegram they had been detained for five hours, but according to other sources the conductor did not think it prudent to proceed until sunrise, when it could more easily be verified that no damage had been done to the tracks or bridge, and that no one would shoot at them. The passengers were cold on the stopped train, with the engine shut down; normally the temperature would have been around 5 °C (41 °F), but it was "unusually cold". Brown's men had blankets over their shoulders and arms; John Cook reported later having been  "chilled through". The passengers were allowed to get off and they "went into the hotel and remained there, in great alarm, for four or five hours."

Several times, Brown later called this incident his "one mistake": "not detaining the train on Sunday night or else permitting it to go on unmolested". Brown scholar Louis DeCaro Jr. called it a "ruinous blunder."

The train departed at dawn, Brown himself, on foot, escorting the train across the bridge. The conductor sent a telegram to W. P. Smith, Master of Transportation at B&O headquarters in Baltimore. Smith's reply to the conductor rejected his report as "exaggerated", but by 10:30 AM he had received confirmation from Martinsburg, Virginia, the next station west of Harpers Ferry. No westbound trains were arriving and three eastbound trains were backed up on the Virginia side of the bridge; because of the cut telegraph line the message had to take a long, roundabout route via the other end of the line in Wheeling, and from there back east via Pittsburgh, causing delay. At that point Smith informed the railroad president, John W. Garrett, who sent telegrams to Major General George H. Steuart of the First Light Division, Maryland Volunteers, Virginia Governor Henry A. Wise, U.S. Secretary of War John B. Floyd, and U.S. President James Buchanan.

Armory employees taken hostage
At about this time Armory employees began arriving for work; they were taken as hostages by Brown's party. Reports differ on how many there were, but there were many more than would fit in the small engine house. Brown divided them into two groups, keeping only the ten most important in the engine house; the others were held in a different Armory building. According to the report of Robert E. Lee, the hostages included:

 Colonel L. W. Washington, of Jefferson County, Virginia
 Mr. J. H. Allstadt, of Jefferson County, Virginia
 Mr. Israel Russell, Justice of the Peace, Harpers Ferry
 Mr. John Donahue, clerk of Baltimore and Ohio Railroad
 Mr. Terence Byrne, of Maryland
 Mr. George D. Shope, of Frederick, Maryland
 Mr. Benjamin Mills, master armorer [weaponmaker], Harpers Ferry Arsenal
 Mr. A. M. Ball, master machinist, Harpers Ferry Arsenal
 Mr. John E.P. Daingerfield or Dangerfield, paymaster's clerk, Acting Paymaster, Harpers Ferry Arsenal, not to be confused with Dangerfield Newby. Brown told him that by noon he would have 1,500 armed men with him. 
 Mr. J. Burd, armorer, Harpers Ferry Arsenal

All save the last were held in the engine house. According to a newspaper report, there were "not less than sixty"; another report says "upwards of seventy". they were detained in "a large building further down the yard". The number of rebels sometimes was inflated because some observers, who had to remain at a distance, thought that the hostages were part of Brown's party.

Armed citizens arrive
As it became known that citizens had been taken hostage by an armed group, men of Harpers Ferry found themselves without arms other than fowling-pieces, which were useless at a distance.

Military companies from neighboring towns began to arrive late Monday morning. Among them was Captain John Avis, who would soon be Brown's jailor, who arrived with a company of militia from Charles Town.

Also according to the report of Lee, who does not mention Avis, the following volunteer militia groups arrived between 11 AM and his arrival in the evening:

 Jefferson Guards and volunteers from Charles Town, under Captain J. W. Rowen
 Hamtramck Guards, Jefferson County, Captain V. M. Butler
 Shepherdstown troop, Captain Jacob Rienahart
 Captain Ephraim G. Alburtis's company, by train from Martinsburg. Most of the militia members were employees of the Baltimore & Ohio Railroad shops there. They freed all the hostages except those in the engine house.
 Captain B. B. Washington's company from Winchester
 Three companies from Fredericktown, Maryland,  under Colonel Shriver
 Companies from Baltimore, under General Charles C. Edgerton, second light brigade

Expecting that thousands of slaves would join him, Brown stayed too long in Harpers Ferry. Harpers Ferry is on a narrow peninsula, almost an island; it is sometimes called "the Island of Virginia". By noon hopes of escape were gone, as his men had lost control of both bridges leading out of town, which because of the terrain were the only practical escape routes. The other bridge, of which not even the pillars remain (the visible pillars are from a later bridge), went east over the Shenandoah River from Harpers Ferry.

The militia companies, under the direction of Colonels R. W. Baylor and John T. Gibson, forced the insurgents to abandon their positions and, since escape was impossible, fortify themselves in "a sturdy stone building", the most defensible in the Armory, the fire engine house, which would be known later as John Brown's Fort. (There were two fire engines; which Greene described as old-fashioned and heavy, plus a hose cart.) They blocked the few windows, used the engines and hose cart to block the heavy doors, and reinforced the doors with rope, making small holes on the walls and through them trading sporadic gunfire with the surrounding militia. Between 2 and 3 there was "a great deal of firing".

During the day four townspeople were killed, including the mayor, who managed the Harpers Ferry station and was a former county sheriff. Eight militiamen were wounded. But the militia, besides the poor quality of their weapons, were disorderly and unreliable. "Most of them [militiamen] got roaring drunk." "A substantial proportion of the militia (along with many of the townspeople) had become a disorganized, drunken, and cowering mob by the time that Colonel Robert E. Lee and the U.S. Marines captured Brown on Tuesday, October 18." The Charleston Mercury called it a "broad and pathetic farce". According to several reports, Governor Wise was outraged at the poor performance of the local militia.

At one point Brown sent out his son Watson and Aaron Dwight Stevens with a white flag, but Watson was mortally wounded by a shot from a town man, expiring after more than 24 hours of agony, and Stevens was shot and taken prisoner. The raid was clearly failing. One of Brown's men, William H. Leeman, panicked and made an attempt to flee by swimming across the Potomac River, but he was shot and killed while doing so. During the intermittent shooting, another son of Brown, Oliver, was also hit; he died, next to his father, after a brief period. Brown's third participating son, Owen, escaped (with great difficulty) via Pennsylvania to the relative safety of his brother John Jr.'s house in Ashtabula County in northeast Ohio, but he was not part of the Harpers Ferry action; he was guarding the weapons at their base, the Kennedy Farm, just across the river in Maryland.

Buchanan calls out the Marines
Late in the afternoon President Buchanan called out a detachment of U.S. Marines from the Washington Navy Yard, the only federal troops in the immediate area: 81 privates, 11 sergeants, 13 corporals, and 1 bugler, armed with seven howitzers. The Marines left for Harper's Ferry on the regular 3:30 train, arriving about 10 PM. Israel Greene was in charge.

To command them Buchanan ordered Brevet Colonel Robert E. Lee, conveniently on leave at his home, just across the Potomac in Arlington, Virginia, to "repair" to Harpers Ferry, where he arrived about 10 PM, on a special train. Lee had no uniform readily available, and wore civilian clothes.

Tuesday, October 18

The Marines break through the engine house door

At 6:30 AM Lee began the attack on the engine house. He first offered the role of attacking it to the local militia units, but both commanders declined. Lee then sent Lt. J. E. B. Stuart, serving as a volunteer aide-de-camp, under a white flag of truce to offer John Brown and his men the option of surrendering. Colonel Lee informed Lt. Israel Greene that if Brown did not surrender, he was to direct the Marines to attack the engine house. Stuart walked towards the front of the engine house where he told Brown that his men would be spared if they surrendered. Brown refused and as Stuart walked away, he made a pre-arranged signal—waving his hat—to Lt. Greene and his men standing nearby.

Greene's men then tried to break in using sledgehammers, but their efforts were unsuccessful. He found a ladder nearby, and he and about twelve Marines used it as a battering ram to break down the sturdy doors. Greene was the first through the door and with the assistance of Lewis Washington, identified and singled out John Brown. Greene later recounted what events occurred next:

Quicker than thought I brought my saber down with all my strength upon [Brown's] head. He was moving as the blow fell, and I suppose I did not strike him where I intended, for he received a deep saber cut in the back of the neck. He fell senseless on his side, then rolled over on his back. He had in his hand a short Sharpe's cavalry carbine. I think he had just fired as I reached Colonel Washington, for the Marine who followed me into the aperture made by the ladder received a bullet in the abdomen, from which he died in a few minutes. The shot might have been fired by someone else in the insurgent party, but I think it was from Brown. Instinctively as Brown fell I gave him a saber thrust in the left breast. The sword I carried was a light uniform weapon, and, either not having a point or striking something hard in Brown's accouterments, did not penetrate. The blade bent double.

Two of the raiders were killed, and the rest taken prisoner. Brown was wounded before and after his surrender. The hostages were freed and the assault was over. It lasted three minutes.

According to one marine, the raiders presented a sad appearance:

Colonel Lee and Jeb Stuart searched the surrounding country for fugitives who had participated in the attack. Few of Brown's associates escaped, and among the five who did, some were sheltered by abolitionists in the North, including William Still.

Interviews
All the bodies were taken out and laid on the ground in front. "A detail of [Greene's] men" carried Brown and Edwin Coppock, the only other white survivor of the attack on the engine house, to the adjacent office of the paymaster, where they lay on the floor for over a day. Until they went with the group to the Charles Town jail on Wednesday, there is no record of the location of the two surviving captured Black raiders, Shields Green and John Anthony Copeland, who were also the only two survivors of the engine house with no injuries. Green attempted unsuccessfully to disguise himself as one of the enslaved of Colonel Washington being liberated.

From this point forward, Brown would endlessly be interrogated by soldiers, politicians, lawyers, reporters, citizens, and preachers. He welcomed the attention.

The first to interview him was Virginia congressman Alexander Boteler, who rode over from his home in nearby Shepherdstown, West Virginia, and was present when Brown was carried out of the engine house, and told a Catholic priest to leave. Five people, in addition to several reporters, came almost immediately to Harpers Ferry specifically to interview Brown. He was interviewed at length as he lay there over 24 hours; he had been without food and sleep for over 48 hours. ("Brown carried no provisions on the expedition, as if God would rain down manna from the skies as He had done for the Israelites in the wilderness.") The first interviewers after Boteler were Virginia Governor Wise, his attorney Andrew Hunter, who was also the leading attorney in Jefferson County, and Robert Ould, United States Attorney for the District of Columbia, sent by President Buchanan. Governor Wise having left—he set up a base in a Harpers Ferry hotel—Brown was then interviewed by Senator James M. Mason, from Winchester, Virginia, and Representatives Charles J. Faulkner, from Martinsville, Virginia, and Copperhead Clement Vallandigham, from Ohio. (Brown lived for years in Ohio, and both Watson and Owen Brown were born there.) Vallandingham was on his way from Washington to Ohio via the B&O Railroad, which of course would take him through Harpers Ferry. In Baltimore he was informed about the raid.

Up until this point, most public opinion in the North and West had seen Brown as a fanatic, a crazy man, attacking Virginia with only 22 men, of whom 10 were killed immediately, and 7 others would soon be hanged, as well as 5 deaths and 9 injuries among the Marines and local population. With the newspaper reports of these interviews, followed by Brown's widely reported words at his trial, the public perception of Brown changed suddenly and dramatically. According to Henry David Thoreau, "I know of nothing so miraculous in our history. Years were not required for a revolution of public opinion; days, nay hours, produced marked changes."

Governor Wise, though firmly in favor of Brown's execution, called him "the gamest man I ever saw". Boteler also spoke well of him. Representative Vallandingham, described later by Thoreau as an enemy of Brown, made the following comment after reaching Ohio:

Like Mason (see below), Vallandingham thought Brown could not possibly have thought of and planned the raid by himself.

Interview by Governor Wise
Virginia Governor Wise, with a force of ninety men, who were disappointed that the action was already over, arrived from Richmond about midday Tuesday. "Learning how quickly the Marines had crushed the raid, Wise 'boiled over', and said he would rather have lost both legs and both arms from his shoulders and hips than such a disgrace should have been cast upon it [Virginia, since Brown held off all the local militia]. That fourteen white men and five negroes should have captured the government works and all Harper's Ferry, and have found It possible to retain them for [even] one hour, while  Col. Lee, with twelve marines, settled the matter in ten minutes."

Wise interviewed Brown while he, along with Stevens, was lying on the floor of the paymaster's office at the Arsenal, where they would remain until, over thirty hours later, they were moved to the Jefferson County jail. Brown, despite his wounds, was "courteous and afable". Andrew Hunter took notes, but there is no transcript of this interview. One exchange was as follows:

The paymaster's clerk at the Arsenal, Captain J.E.P. Dangerfield (not to be confused with Dangerfield Newby), was taken hostage when he arrived for work. He was present at this interview, and remarked that: "Governor Wise was astonished at the answers he received from Brown." Back in Richmond, on Saturday, October 22, in a speech widely reported in the newspapers, Wise himself stated:

Wise also reported the opinion of Lewis Washington, in a passage called "well known" in 1874: "Colonel Washington says that he, Brown, was the coolest and firmest man he ever saw in defying danger and death. With one son dead by his side, and another shot through, he felt the pulse of his dying son with one hand and held his rifle with the other, and commanded his men with the utmost composure, encouraging them to be firm, and to sell their lives as dearly as they could."

Wise left for his hotel in Harpers Ferry about dinnertime Tuesday.

Interview by Senator Mason and two Representatives
Virginia Senator James M. Mason lived in nearby Winchester, and would later chair the Select Senate committee investigating the raid. He also came immediately to Harpers Ferry to interview Brown. Congressmen Clement Vallandigham of Ohio, who called Brown "sincere, earnest, practical", Charles J. Faulkner of Virginia, Robert E. Lee, and "several other distinguished gentlemen" were also present. The audience averaged 10 to 12. Lee said that he would exclude all visitors from the room if the wounded men were annoyed or pained by them, but Brown said he was by no means annoyed; on the contrary, he was glad to be able to make himself and his motives "clearly understood".

A reporter-stenographer of the New York Herald produced a "verbatim" transcript of the interview, although it started before he arrived, shortly after 2 PM. Published in full or part in many newspapers, it is the most complete public statement we have of Brown about the raid.

Wednesday, October 19
Lee and the Marines, except for Greene, left Harper's Ferry for Washington on the 1:15 AM train, the only express east. He finished his report and sent it to the War Department that day.

He made a synopsis of the events that took place at Harpers Ferry. According to Lee's report: "the plan [raiding the Harpers Ferry Arsenal] was the attempt of a fanatic or madman". Lee also believed that the Blacks in the raid were forced by Brown. "The blacks, whom he [John Brown] forced from their homes in this neighborhood, as far as I could learn, gave him no voluntary assistance." Lee attributed John Brown's "temporary success" to the panic and confusion and to "magnifying" the number of participants involved in the raid. Lee said that he was sending the Marines back to the Navy Yard.
 

"Governor Wise is still [Wednesday] here busily engaged in a personal investigation of the whole affair, and seems to be using every means for bringing to retribution all the participators in it."

A holograph copy of Brown's Provisional Constitution, held by the Yale University Library, bears the handwritten annotation: "Handed to Gov. Wise by John Brown on Wed Oct 19/59 before he was removed from the U.S. grounds at Harpers Ferry & while he lay wounded on his cot."

On Wednesday evening the prisoners were moved by train from Harpers Ferry to Charles Town, where they were placed in the Jefferson County jail, "a very pretty jail, ...like a handsome private residence", the press reported. Governor Wise and Andrew Hunter, his attorney, accompanied them. The Jefferson County jail was "a meek-looking edifice, [which] must have been a respectable private residence". Brown wrote his family: "I am supplied with almost everything I could desire to make me comfortable". According to the New York Tribunes  reporter on the scene:

Trial and execution

Brown was hastily processed by the legal system. He was charged by a grand jury with treason against the Commonwealth of Virginia, murder, and inciting a slave insurrection. A jury found him guilty of all charges; he was sentenced to death on November 2, and after a legally-required delay of 30 days he was hanged on December 2. (This execution was witnessed by the poet Walt Whitman and the actor John Wilkes Booth; Booth would later assassinate President Abraham Lincoln.) At the hanging and en route to it, authorities prevented spectators from getting close enough to Brown to hear a final speech. He wrote his last words on a scrap of paper given to his jailer Capt. John Avis, whose treatment Brown spoke well of in his letters:

I John Brown am now quite certain that the crimes of this guilty, land: will never be purged away; but with Blood. I had as I now think: vainly flattered myself that without very much bloodshed; it might be done.

Four other raiders were executed on December 16 and two more on March 16, 1860.

In his last speech, at his sentencing, he said to the court:

[H]ad I so interfered in behalf of the rich, the powerful, the intelligent, the so-called great, or in behalf of any of their friends, either father, mother, brother, sister, wife, or children, or any of that class, and suffered and sacrificed what I have in this interference, it would have been all right; and every man in this court would have deemed it an act worthy of reward rather than punishment.

Southerners had a mixed attitude towards their slaves. Many Southern whites lived in constant fear of another slave insurrection; almost paradoxically, whites claimed that slaves were content in bondage, blaming slave unrest on Northern abolitionists. After the raid Southerners initially lived in fear of slave uprisings and invasion by armed abolitionists. The South's reaction entered the second phase at around the time of Brown's execution. Southerners were relieved that no slaves had volunteered to help Brown, as they were incorrectly told by Governor Wise and others (see John Brown's raiders#Black participation), and felt vindicated in their claims that slaves were content. After Northerners had expressed admiration for Brown's motives, with some treating him as a martyr, Southern opinion evolved into what James M. McPherson called "unreasoning fury".

The first Northern reaction among antislavery advocates to Brown's raid was one of baffled reproach. Wm. Lloyd Garrison called the raid "misguided, wild, and apparently insane". But through the trial and his execution, Brown was transformed into a martyr. Henry David Thoreau, in A Plea for Captain John Brown, said, "I think that for once the Sharp's rifles and the revolvers were employed in a righteous cause. The tools were in the hands of one who could use them", and said of Brown, "He has a spark of divinity in him." Though "Harper's Ferry was insane", wrote the religious weekly the Independent, "the controlling motive of his demonstration was sublime". To the South, Brown was a murderer who wanted to deprive them of their property (slaves). The North "has sanctioned and applauded theft, murder, and treason", said De Bow's Review. According to the Richmond Enquirer, the South's reaction was "horror and indignation".

Consequences of Brown's raid
When examining the events which led to the Civil War, Brown's raid is the last major event (see sidebar, above). According to the Richmond Enquirer, "The Harper's Ferry invasion has advanced the cause of Disunion, more than any other event that has happened since the formation of the Government; it has rallied to that standard men who formerly looked upon it with horror; it has revived, with tenfold strength[,] the desire of a Southern Confederacy."

His well-publicized raid, a complete failure in the short term, contributed to Lincoln's election in 1860, and Jefferson Davis "cited the attack as grounds for Southerners to leave the Union, 'even if it rushes us into a sea of blood. Seven Southern states seceded to form the Confederacy. The Civil War followed; Brown seemed to be calling for war in his last message before his execution: "the crimes of this guilty land will never be purged away but with Blood".

However, as put by David Reynolds, "The raid on Harpers Ferry helped dislodge slavery, but not in the way Brown had foreseen. It did not ignite slave uprisings throughout the South. Instead, it had an immense impact because of the way Brown behaved during and after it, and the way it was perceived by key figures on both sides of the slavery divide. The raid did not cause the storm. John Brown and the reaction to him did."

Brown's raid, trial, and execution energized both the abolitionists in the North and the pro-slavers in the South, and brought a flurry of political organizing. Public meetings in support of Brown, sometimes also raising money for his family, were held across the North. "These meetings gave the era's most illustrious thinkers and activists an opportunity to renew their assault on slavery." It strongly reinforced Southern sentiment for secession.

Casualties

John Brown's raiders

Counting John Brown, there were 22 raiders, 15 white and 7 Black. 10 were killed during the raid, 7 were tried and executed afterwards, and 5 escaped. In addition, Brown was assisted by at least two local enslaved people; one was killed and the other died in jail.

Other casualties, civilian and military
 Killed Heyward Shepherd, a free African-American B&O baggage master. He was buried in the African-American cemetery on Rt. 11 in Winchester, Virginia. In 1932 no one could find his grave. Subsequently, Winchester's Old Colored Cemetery has been paved over and the location used for parking.
 Private Luke Quinn, U.S. Marines, was killed during the storming of the engine house. He was buried in Harpers Ferry Catholic Cemetery on Rte. 340.
 Thomas Boerly, townsperson. According to Richard Hinton, "Mr. Burleigh" was killed by Shields Green.
 George W. Turner, townsperson.
 Fontaine Beckham, Harpers Ferry mayor, B&O stationmaster, former sheriff. Mayor Beckham's Will Book called for the liberation of Isaac Gilbert, Gilbert's wife, and their three children upon his death. When Edwin Coppock killed Beckham the enslaved family was thus freed.
 An enslaved man belonging to Colonel Washington was killed.
 An enslaved man belonging to hostage John Allstad was killed. Both slaves voluntarily joined Brown's raiders. One was killed trying to escape across the Potomac River; the other was wounded and later died in the Charles Town jail.
 Wounded but survived'''
 Private Matthew Ruppert, U. S. Marines, was shot in the face during the storming of the engine house.
 Edward McCabe, Harpers Ferry laborer.
 Samuel C. Young, Charles Town militia. As he was "permanently disabled by a wound received in defence of Southern institutions" [slavery], a pamphlet was published to raise money for him.
 Martinsburg, Virginia, militia:
 George Murphy
 George Richardson
 G. N. Hammond
 Evan Dorsey
 Nelson Hooper
 George Woollett

 Legacy 

Many of John Brown's homes are today small museums. John Brown is featured in an extremely large mural  (11'6" tall and 31' long) painted in the Kansas State Capitol in Topeka, Kansas. In "Tragic Prelude," by Kansan John Steuart Curry, the larger-than-life figure of John Brown dominates a scene of war, death, and destruction. Wildfires and a tornado are backdrops to his zeal and fervor. The only major street anywhere named for John Brown is in Port-au-Prince, Haiti (where there is also an Avenue Charles Sumner). In Harpers Ferry today, the engine house, known today as John Brown's Fort, sits in a park, open to walk through, where visitors are presented with an interpretive display providing a summary of the events at the site.

Another monument is the cenotaph to three Black participants, in Oberlin, Ohio.

 Harpers Ferry National Historical Park 
Just as in the town of Harpers Ferry, John Brown and the raid are downplayed at the Harpers Ferry National Historical Park. Harpers Ferry and some surrounding areas were designated as a National Monument in 1944. Congress later designated it as the Harpers Ferry National Historical Park in 1963. It is managed by the National Park Service. The park includes the historic town of Harpers Ferry, notable as a center of 19th-century industry and as the scene of the uprising.

 Grave site 
John Brown is buried on his farm near Lake Placid, New York. It is maintained as the New York John Brown Farm State Historic Site. His son Watson is also buried there, and the bones of his son Oliver and nine other raiders are buried in a single coffin.

 Conflicting interpretations 

 
From 1859 until the assassination of President Lincoln in 1865, Brown was the most famous American. He was the symbol of the nation's polarization: in the North he was a hero, and the day of his execution a day of mourning; flags were flown at half mast in some cities. To white Southerners, he was an outlaw, a traitor, promoting slave insurrection, their worst nightmare; secession could no longer be avoided.

Doubt has been raised as to whether Brown believed his implausible, undermanned attack could succeed, or whether he knew it was doomed yet wanted the publicity it would generate for the abolitionist cause. Certainly he "fail[ed] to take the steps necessary" to make it succeed: he never called on nearby slaves to join the uprising, for example. According to Garrison, "His raid into Virginia looks utterly lacking in common sense—a desperate self-sacrifice for the purpose of giving an earthquake shock to the slave system, and thus hastening the day for a universal catastrophe." Brown's Provisional Constitution, of which he had stacks of copies printed, "was not just a governing document. It was a scare tactic".

As Brown wrote in 1851: "The trial for life of one bold and to some extent successful man, for defending his rights in good earnest, would arouse more sympathy throughout the nation than the accumulated wrongs and suffering of more than three millions of our submissive colored population." According to his son Salmon, fifty years later: "He wanted to bring on the war. I have heard him talk of it many times." Certainly Brown saw to it that his arrest, trial, and execution received as much publicity as possible. He "ask[ed] that the incendiary constitution he carried with him be read aloud." "He seemed very fond of talking." Authorities deliberately prevented spectators from being close enough to Brown to hear him speak during his short trip to the gallows, but he did give what became his famous final message to a jailer who had asked for his autograph.

Notes

See also
 Bleeding Kansas
 John Brown's body, about his funeral in North Elba
 John Brown's Body (song)
 John Brown's Fort
 John Brown's last speech
 John Brown's Provisional Constitution
 John Brown's raiders
 List of incidents of civil unrest in the United States
 List of sources for John Brown's raid on Harpers Ferry
 Origins of the American Civil War
 Virginia v. John Brown Mary Ellen Pleasent

References

Further reading

 Primary sources (arranged from oldest to most recent)
 
 
 
 
  Same text is more legible here .
 
 
 
 
 Secondary sources (alphabetical)
 Earle, Jonathan. John Brown's Raid on Harpers Ferry: A Brief History with Documents (2008) excerpt and text search
 Field, Ron. Avenging Angel; John Brown's Raid on Harpers Ferry 1859 (2012). Osprey Raid Series #36. Osprey Publishing. 
 Horwitz, Tony. Midnight Rising: John Brown and the Raid That Sparked the Civil War (2011) Henry Holt and Company

  Reviewed
 
 
 Nevins, Allan. The Emergence of Lincoln: Prelude to Civil War, 1859–1861 (1950), vol 4 of The Ordeal of the Union, esp ch 3 pp. 70–97
 Oates, Stephen B. To Purge this Land with Blood: A Biography of John Brown (1984). Amherst, MA: The University of Massachusetts Press.
 Potter, David M. The Impending Crisis: 1848–1861 (1976) pp. 356–84; Pulitzer Prize winning history
 Reynolds, David S. John Brown, Abolitionist: The Man Who Killed Slavery, Sparked the Civil War, and Seeded Civil Rights (2006)
 

External links
 
 
 "John Brown – 150 Years After Harpers Ferry" by Terry Bisson, Monthly Review'', October 2009

 
Conflicts in 1859
1859 crimes in the United States
Political violence in the United States
United States military killing of American civilians
1859 in Virginia
United States Marine Corps in the 18th and 19th centuries
Rebellions in the United States
Slave rebellions in the United States
Military raids
Crimes in Virginia
October 1859 events
Riots and civil disorder in Virginia
Origins of the American Civil War
Treason in the United States
Abolitionism in the United States
Recipients of aid from Gerrit Smith
History of Jefferson County, West Virginia
Baltimore and Ohio Railroad
History of slavery in Virginia
Jefferson County, West Virginia in the American Civil War
Stonewall Jackson